The New River Branch Library is a public library that primarily serves the Wesley Chapel, Florida area, and is one of eight libraries that are part of Pasco County's overall library system, the Pasco County Library Cooperative. It is currently located at 34043 State Road 54, Zephyrhills, Florida. The library opened on October 31, 1991.

Services 
The New River Branch Library was closed for remodeling until Fall 2020. It offers many standard library services including books, audio books, DVD's, a large meeting space and a community garden. It provides computers, study rooms, and programs for all ages such as book clubs, reading clubs, gaming, story time, family movies. Patrons also have access to e-content such as databases, eBooks and audio books through Overdrive, Hoopla, Flipster Magazines, and New York Times. It also provides eGovernment resources as well as computers for job searching.

References

External links 
 New River Branch Library | Pasco Libraries

Public libraries in Florida
Buildings and structures in Pasco County, Florida